Long County is a county located in the U.S. state of Georgia. The county seat is Ludowici. Long County is part of the  Hinesville-Fort Stewart Metropolitan Statistical Area. The constitutional amendment to create the county was proposed August 14, 1920, and ratified November 2, 1920. The county is named after Crawford Long (1815–1878), American surgeon and pharmacist, first to use diethyl ether as an anaesthetic.

As of the 2020 census, the population was 16,168. With a per-capita income of $22,599, Long County is #10 on the list of lowest-income counties in the United States.

Geography

The majority of Long County, roughly centered on Ludowici, is located in the Altamaha River sub-basin of the basin by the same name. The county's northeastern portion, east of Glennville and northwest of Walthourville, is located in the Canoochee River sub-basin of the Ogeechee River basin. Long County's southeastern portion is located in the Ogeechee Coastal sub-basin of the larger Ogeechee basin.

Major highways

  U.S. Route 25
  U.S. Route 84
  U.S. Route 301
  State Route 23
  State Route 38
  State Route 57
  State Route 144
  State Route 196

Adjacent counties
 Liberty County (northeast)
 McIntosh County (southeast)
 Wayne County (southwest)
 Tattnall County (northwest)

Demographics

2000 census 
As of the census of 2000, there were 10,304 people, 3,574 households, and 2,676 families living in the county. There were 4,232 housing units at an average density of 11 per square mile (4/km2). The racial makeup of the county was 68.41% White, 24.25% Black or African American, 0.73% Native American, 0.57% Asian, 0.25% Pacific Islander, 3.91% from other races, and 1.87% from two or more races.  8.44% of the population were Hispanic or Latino of any race.

There were 3,574 households, out of which 45.60% had children under the age of 18 living with them, 55.00% were married couples living together, 14.50% had a female householder with no husband present, and 25.10% were non-families. 19.60% of all households were made up of individuals, and 5.20% had someone living alone who was 65 years of age or older.  The average household size was 2.88 and the average family size was 3.28.

In the county, the population was spread out, with 33.10% under the age of 18, 14.20% from 18 to 24, 31.00% from 25 to 44, 15.90% from 45 to 64, and 5.80% who were 65 years of age or older.  The median age was 26 years. For every 100 females, there were 102.10 males.  For every 100 females age 18 and over, there were 100.70 males.

The median income for a household in the county was $30,640, and the median income for a family was $32,473. Males had a median income of $26,416 versus $18,732 for females. The per capita income for the county was $12,586.  About 17.60% of families and 19.50% of the population were below the poverty line, including 26.00% of those under age 18 and 19.80% of those age 65 or over.

2010 census
As of the 2010 United States Census, there were 14,464 people, 5,023 households, and 3,654 families living in the county. The racial makeup of the county was 62.4% white, 25.2% black or African American, 0.8% Asian, 0.6% American Indian, 0.4% Pacific islander, 7.2% from other races, and 3.4% from two or more races. Those of Hispanic or Latino origin made up 12.3% of the population. In terms of ancestry, 12.1% were German, 10.6% were Irish, 8.3% were American, and 7.1% were English.

Of the 5,023 households, 44.2% had children under the age of 18 living with them, 48.8% were married couples living together, 18.1% had a female householder with no husband present, 27.3% were non-families, and 22.4% of all households were made up of individuals. The average household size was 2.81 and the average family size was 3.28. The median age was 30.6 years.

The median income for a household in the county was $41,186 and the median income for a family was $46,654. Males had a median income of $30,921 versus $25,675 for females. The per capita income for the county was $15,068. About 11.6% of families and 15.8% of the population were below the poverty line, including 20.6% of those under age 18 and 20.0% of those age 65 or over.

2020 census

As of the 2020 United States census, there were 16,168 people, 5,695 households, and 4,146 families residing in the county.

Communities
 Aimar
 Beards Creek
 Donald
 Ludowici (county seat)
 Tibet

Education

Long County School System operates public schools for grades K-12 in the county, except parts in Fort Stewart. Fort Stewart has the Department of Defense Education Activity (DoDEA) as its local school district, for the elementary level. Students at the secondary level on Fort Stewart attend public schools operated by county school districts.

Politics

See also

 National Register of Historic Places listings in Long County, Georgia
List of counties in Georgia

References

 
Georgia (U.S. state) counties
1920 establishments in Georgia (U.S. state)
Populated places established in 1920
Hinesville metropolitan area